The 2002–03 George Mason Patriots men's basketball team began their 37th season of collegiate play on November 22, 2002 versus Central Michigan University.  The Patriots finished the season with a record of 16 wins and 12 losses and was selected to the 2004 National Invitation Tournament.  They subsequently lost to the Oregon Ducks in the second round of the tournament.

Season notes

Awards

First Team All-CAA
 Jesse Young

CAA All-Defensive Team
 Jon Larranaga

CAA All-Rookie Team
 Jai Lewis

Roster

Player stats

Game log

Recruits

The following is a list of commitments George Mason has received for the 2004-2005 season:
 Folarin Campbell
 Jordan Carter
 Will Thomas
 John Vaughan

References

George Mason
George Mason Patriots men's basketball seasons
2002 in sports in Virginia
2003 in sports in Virginia